Matteo Trevisan and Thomas Fabbiano were the defending champions but decided not to participate.
Jorge Aguilar and Andrés Molteni won the title, defeating Giulio Di Meo and Stefano Ianni 6–4, 6–4 in the final.

Seeds

  Alessio di Mauro /  Alessandro Motti (quarterfinals)
  Sadik Kadir /  Purav Raja (semifinals)
  Jorge Aguilar /  Andrés Molteni (champions)
  Alberto Brizzi /  Marco Crugnola (quarterfinals)

Draw

Draw

References
 Main Draw

Trani Cup - Doubles
Trani Cup